The third annual Nickelodeon Australian Kids' Choice Awards were held at the Sydney Entertainment Centre on 20 September 2005. The show was hosted by Jesse McCartney, James Kerley and Dave Lawson.

Nominees and winners
Winners in Bold.

Music

Fave Music Artist
Delta Goodrem
Guy Sebastian
Jesse McCartney
Anthony Callea

Fave Music Group
Simple Plan
Green Day
Destiny’s Child
Good Charlotte

Fave Music Video
Delta Goodrem – A Little Too Late
Gwen Stefani – Hollaback Girl 
Guy Sebastian – Oh Oh
Evermore – Come to Nothing

Movies

Fave Movie Star
Hilary Duff
Will Smith
Lindsay Lohan
Ben Stiller

Fave Movie
Raise Your Voice
Hating Alison Ashley
The Incredibles
SpongeBob SquarePants Movie

TV

Fave TV Star
Rebecca Cartwright
Jesse McCartney
Amanda Bynes
Jason Smith

Fave TV Show
The O.C.
Home and Away
The Simpsons
Unfabulous

People

Fave Sports Star
Ian Thorpe
Lleyton Hewitt
Jodie Henry
Liz Ellis

Fave Aussie
Delta Goodrem
Rebecca Cartwright
Guy Sebastian
Ian Thorpe

Fave Rising Star
Emma Roberts 
Indianna Evans 
Jo Jo 
Sonny Bill Williams

Fave Old Fart
Ian "Dicko" Dickson
Mark Holden
Bert Newton
Alf Stewart

Fave Celeb Duo
The Sarvo Boys
Rebecca Cartwright and Lleyton Hewitt
Andrew G and James Mathison
Merrick and Rosso

Fave Meanie
Big Brother
Angelica Pickles
Kyle Sandilands
Mark Holden

Fave Hottie
Jesse McCartney
Guy Sebastian 
Chad Michael Murray 
Chris Hemsworth

Random

Fave Book
Harry Potter series
Hating Alison Ashley (novel)
Lemony Snicket series
The Lord of the Rings series

Fave Video Game
The SpongeBob SquarePants Movie Game
Need for Speed: Underground 2
EyeToy: Play 2
SingStar Party

Fave Animal Star
Bootsy (Sarvo)
Toby (Dr Katrina Warren’s dog)
Donkey from Shrek
Spike from Rugrats

Fave Pash
Seth and Summer (on The O.C.)
Sharon Strezlecki and Ian Thorpe (at the Logies)
James Kerley and Alyssa Milano (on the Orange Carpet at the US kids’ Choice Awards)
Tash and Robbie (on Home and Away)

References

External links
Official KCA 2005 site

Nickelodeon Kids' Choice Awards
Australian music awards
Nickelodeon (Australia and New Zealand) original programming
2005 awards